The Garde de Bordon is a mountain in the Pennine Alps.

Access

To get to the mountain, visitors follow the road from the Rhone valley, from Sierre and through Val d’ Anniverse in the direction of Grimentz. The other option is to continue to Zinal.

Climbing
The mountain is climbed either from the Zinal side, or from the Moiry lake where the route starts directly at the dam. In both cases a climber's first goal is Col de Sorebois (2835 m). There are cairns marking the route.

References

External links 
 Garde de Bordon - Route description on Mountains for Everybody.

Mountains of the Alps
Alpine three-thousanders
Mountains of Valais
Mountains of Switzerland